Nyctemera oninica is a moth of the family Erebidae. The species is found in Papua, where it has been recorded from the Onin Peninsula, the Wandammen Peninsula and Roon Island.

The length of the forewings is 21–22 mm. The forewings are chocolate brown, the basal half with white veins. The wingfold and longitudinal line in the cell are also white. The fascia are broad and crossed by veins suffused with brown. The hindwings are white with a narrow brown hindmargin.

Etymology
The species name refers to the type location, the Onin Peninsula.

References

Nyctemerina
Moths described in 2007